The 1996 PBA Governors Cup Finals was the best-of-7 basketball championship series of the 1996 PBA Governors Cup, and the conclusion of the conference's playoffs. The Alaska Milkmen and Ginebra San Miguel played for the 65th championship contested by the league.

The Alaska Milkmen captured the coveted grandslam, winning their finals series over Ginebra San Miguel, 4 games to 1.

Johnny Abarrientos won on his first PBA Finals MVP in Governors Cup Finals.

Qualification

Series scoring summary

Games summary

Game 1

The Ginebras fumbled despite taking small leads in the first three quarters, the Gins had 27 turnovers compared to the Milkmen's 15, those turnovers keyed Alaska's fourth quarter run that limited Ginebra to a low output.

Game 2

The Milkmen led 104–91 with 3:40 to go, the Gins tried to rally with Fred Cofield hitting a triple to spark a 12–2 run and pulled Ginebra up close, 103–106, time down to 45.6 seconds.

Game 3

Alaska broke the game wide open with an 82–66 lead in the final quarter. Ginebra shot a dismal 33 percent from the floor.

Game 4

New Ginebra import Derrick Rucker banked in the marginal basket with 29.7 seconds to go, after Jojo Lastimosa's short jumper drew Alaska to within 97–96, with 14.2 seconds left, Rucker's inbound pass was intercepted by Poch Juinio but the Milkmen failed to get a shot on time.

Game 5

Johnny Abarrientos engineered a searing 11–0 blast from a 62–69 deficit to a 73–69 lead for Alaska at the end of the third quarter. Abarrientos' jumper gave the Milkmen an 89–82 lead going into the last two minutes of the final period Then Johnny Abarrientos on his first Finals MVP and Alaska captures on his 3 peat grand slam champion 6th title.

Rosters

Broadcast notes

References

External links
PBA official website

1996 PBA season
1996
Alaska Aces (PBA) games
Barangay Ginebra San Miguel games
PBA Governors' Cup Finals